Takayuki Suzuki may refer to:
 Takayuki Suzuki (born 1976), 鈴木 隆行 Japanese international football player
 Takayuki Suzuki (footballer, born 1973), 鈴木 敬之 Japanese football player
 Takayuki Suzuki (swimmer) (born 1987), 鈴木 孝幸 Japanese Paralympic swimmer